Zawady-Tworki  is a village in the administrative district of Gmina Prostki, within Ełk County, Warmian-Masurian Voivodeship, in northern Poland.

The village has a population of 140.

References

Zawady-Tworki